Ullathorne is a surname. Notable people with the surname include:

 Charles Ullathorne (1845–1904), English cricketer
 Robert Ullathorne (born 1971), English footballer and football agent
 William Bernard Ullathorne  (1806–1889), English Catholic bishop

See also
 Bishop Ullathorne Roman Catholic School